Ribs of pork, beef, lamb, and venison are a cut of meat.  The term ribs usually refers to the less meaty part of the chops, often cooked as a slab (not cut into separate ribs). Ribs of bison, goat, ostrich, crocodile, alligator, llama, alpaca, beefalo, African buffalo, water buffalo, kangaroo, deer, and other animals are also consumed in various parts of the world.

They can be roasted, grilled, fried, sous vide, baked, braised, or smoked. A set of ribs served together (5 or more), is known as a rack (as in a rack of ribs).

Pork ribs were considered cast off cuts and in the 19th century as pork was primarily packaged in wood barrels, butchers would not be able to fit the spareribs. This oversupply of ribs meant that in areas where hogs were being packed or processed, ribs could be found at zero or low cost.  Barbeque ribs became popular in the 20th century at the dawn of mechanical refrigeration.  Before refrigerated transport, barbeque pork ribs would only be consumed as part of a whole "Pig Roast" where a whole pig was often barbequed in a pit.

In American cuisine, ribs usually refers to barbecue pork ribs, or sometimes beef ribs, which are served with various barbecue sauces.  They are served as a rack of meat which diners customarily tear apart by hand, then eat the meat from the bone. Slow roasting or barbecuing for as much as 6-8 hours creates a tender finished product.

See also

Galbi
Meat on the bone
Pork ribs - Pork belly
Prime rib
Short ribs
Spare ribs
Rack of lamb
sous vide

References

External links
 

Cuts of meat
American cuisine